Bodella is a hamlet in mid Cornwall, England, United Kingdom. It is situated half-a-mile southwest of St Dennis in an area of china clay quarries.

References

Hamlets in Cornwall